Saddle Peak is a mountain located in the Santa Monica Mountains between Malibu and Calabasas. The summit is accessible via the Backbone Trail. There is also a feeder trail to the top from near the top of Stunt Road (just 1 block below the ridge intersection with Scheuren Road at the viewpoint) maintained by the Santa Monica Mountains Conservancy. And there is an informal trail up the bottom East nose of the massif right across the intersection from the Scheuren Viewpoint. This latter trail passes around a water tower and eventually joins the main trails near the top.

Vegetation is sparse on the peak; dwarf forest and chaparral on the approaches, scrub and grassy at the top. Some oaks at lower elevations.

The true summit is the South Eastern hummock, much degraded. Views from here are of the Pacific Ocean to the West, and other ridges and peaks of the Santa Monica Mountains to the East and West. There is a second summit reached by private road, to the Northwest, with a wire-fenced compound of numerous radio relay towers. At the far end beyond the compound is a house site foundation in disrepair. This slope burned in 1989. Beyond and below that is a private road back down to Stunt Road, with private residences below.

There are occasionally rattlesnakes on the SMMC trail.

Santa Monica Mountains